Arashi Reborn Vol.1 extended play is the first part of the "Reborn" Project by Arashi. It comprises three songs, one of which, "A-ra-shi: Reborn", was released as a single on December 20, 2019.

The release was via digital download and streaming, with two lyric videos to also be released on the Arashi YouTube channel, on February 28, 2020.

The songs "A Day in Our Life: Reborn" and "Our Love: Reborn" from the EP ranked 1 and 2, respectively, in the "Overall download single daily" ranking chart from Oricon in their 1st day of release. All three topped the weekly chart for "digital single".

Track listing

Charts

See also
2020 in Japanese music#February

References

2020 EPs
Arashi albums
J Storm albums